Theocharis Pozatzidis (born 18 February 1999) is a Greek professional footballer who plays as a striker for Moldovan club Sfîntul Gheorghe.

Personal life
Pozatzidis' cousin, Stelios, is also a professional footballer.

References

1999 births
Living people
Greek footballers
Football League (Greece) players
Gamma Ethniki players
Platanias F.C. players
A.E. Ermionida F.C. players
Trikala F.C. players
Association football forwards
Footballers from Thessaloniki